The Transmembrane protein with an EGF-like and two follistatin-like domains 2 (TMEFF2) gene is located on chromosome 2q32-q33 and encodes a 374-residue long single polypeptide, type-I transmembrane proteoglycan. According to the HUGO gene nomenclature committee, the aliases of TMEFF2 include,HPP1, Tomoregulin (TR), Transmembrane protein TENB2 (TENB2), Cancer/testis antigen family 120, member 2 (CT120.2) and Transmembrane protein containing EGF and follistatin domains (TPEF). TMEFF2 was identified and characterized by at least five independent groups within the time span of approximately a year.

TMEFF2 is proteolytically shed from the cell surface. The reported functions of TMEFF2 span across a wide range of physiological and pathological spectra including metabolism, neuroprotection, apoptosis, embryonic development, onco-suppression and endocrine function. TMEFF2 promoter and its 5′-upstream CpG island are methylated in a number of cancers. An inverse correlation between TMEFF2 methylation and the stage, response to therapy and survival outcome has been observed. The detection of methylated free-circulating TMEFF2 DNA has been suggested as a potential diagnostic tool for colorectal cancer. The TMEFF2 downregulation signature equals and sometimes outperforms the Gleason and pathological scores in prostate cancer. TMEFF2 is downregulated in glioma and cotricotropinomas, and it impairs the production of adrenocorticotropic hormone in glioma cells. Through binding the amyloid β protein, its precursor and derivatives, TMEFF2 provides neuroprotection in Alzheimer's disease.

TMEFF2 is a multidomain protein with its N-terminus harbouring a signal peptide followed by two follistatin-like domains, an EGF (epidermal growth factor)-like domain, a transmembrane portion and a short intracellular domain. The EGF-like domain of TMEFF2 appears to be functionally ineffective because of the substitution of a crucial arginine residue (Arg39) with histidine, whereas the follistatin-like domains are reported to be crucial for the relevant functions of TMEFF2 .

References

Further reading